Khalifa Mubarak Khalfan Khairi Al-Hammadi (born 7 November 1998) is an association footballer who plays for Al-Jazira.

Career
Al Hammadi made his professional debut for Al-Jazira in the UAE Pro-League on 30 November 2017 starting against Al-Sharjah before being substituted out for Ahmed Rabee in the 63rd minute with the match finishing as a 2–1 away win.

Al Hammadi was included in United Arab Emirates's squad for the 2019 AFC Asian Cup in United Arab Emirates.

Career statistics

International

References

External links
 
 
 
 

1998 births
Living people
People from Abu Dhabi
Emirati footballers
United Arab Emirates international footballers
Association football defenders
Al Jazira Club players
UAE Pro League players
2019 AFC Asian Cup players